Matamata is a town in Waikato, New Zealand. It is located near the base of the Kaimai Ranges, and is a thriving farming area known for Thoroughbred horse breeding and training pursuits. It is part of the Matamata-Piako District, which takes in the surrounding rural areas, as well as Morrinsville and Te Aroha. State Highway 27 and the Kinleith Branch railway run through the town.

A nearby farm was the location for the Hobbiton Movie Set in Peter Jackson's The Lord of the Rings. The New Zealand government decided to leave the Hobbit holes built on location as tourist attractions. During the period between the filming of The Lord of the Rings: The Return of the King and The Hobbit: An Unexpected Journey they had no furniture or props, but could be entered with vistas of the farm viewed from inside them. A "Welcome to Hobbiton" sign has been placed on the main road. In 2011, parts of Hobbiton began to close in preparation for the three new movies based on the first Tolkien novel, The Hobbit.

Demographics

Matamata had a population of 7,806 at the 2018 New Zealand census, an increase of 720 people (10.2%) since the 2013 census, and an increase of 1,509 people (24.0%) since the 2006 census. There were 3,111 households, comprising 3,717 males and 4,089 females, giving a sex ratio of 0.91 males per female, with 1,374 people (17.6%) aged under 15 years, 1,314 (16.8%) aged 15 to 29, 2,934 (37.6%) aged 30 to 64, and 2,187 (28.0%) aged 65 or older.

Ethnicities were 84.5% European/Pākehā, 15.7% Māori, 1.7% Pacific peoples, 5.9% Asian, and 1.4% other ethnicities. People may identify with more than one ethnicity.

The percentage of people born overseas was 16.6, compared with 27.1% nationally.

Although some people chose not to answer the census's question about religious affiliation, 49.2% had no religion, 37.2% were Christian, 1.2% had Māori religious beliefs, 1.0% were Hindu, 0.2% were Muslim, 0.7% were Buddhist and 1.8% had other religions.

Of those at least 15 years old, 678 (10.5%) people had a bachelor's or higher degree, and 1,848 (28.7%) people had no formal qualifications. 774 people (12.0%) earned over $70,000 compared to 17.2% nationally. The employment status of those at least 15 was that 2,763 (43.0%) people were employed full-time, 849 (13.2%) were part-time, and 198 (3.1%) were unemployed.

History
In the early nineteenth century, the area including and surrounding the present-day Matamata township was part of the territory of the Ngāti Hinerangi iwi and Ngāti Hauā.

The first European thought to have visited the Matamata area was the trader Phillip Tapsell in about 1830. In 1833 the Reverend Alfred Nesbit Brown visited the area and in 1835 opened a mission near Matamata Pa, but this closed the following year when intertribal warfare broke out. In 1865 Josiah Firth negotiated with Ngāti Hauā leader Wiremu Tamihana and leased a large area of land, including the future site of the town which he named after the pā. Firth constructed a dray road to Cambridge and cleared the Waihou River so that it was navigable by his (small) boats.

Peria, on the outskirts of Matamata, was the scene of the Kīngitanga meeting of 1863.

Firth's estate later failed and by 1904 had been wholly obtained by the Crown and was subdivided into dairy farm units to take advantage of the new technology of refrigeration. It became a dependent Town District in 1917, an independent Town District in 1919 and was constituted a borough in 1935. With the re-organisation of territorial authorities in New Zealand in 1989, Matamata became part of the Matamata-Piako District.

Railway station 

Matamata was a station on the Kinleith Branch, from Monday 8 March 1886. It was built by Mr D Fallon for the Thames Valley & Rotorua Railway Co. New Zealand Railways Department took over the line on 1 April 1886. Initially 40 minutes north of the temporary terminus at Oxford (Tirau) and about an hour from Morrinsville. By 1886 it also had a coal shed able to hold 50 tons, a stationmaster's house, 2 cottages, urinals and a  brick water tank supplied by a  diameter windpump from a well, which was deepened that year. By 1896 Matamata had gained a 4th class station, platform, cart approach and a passing loop for 32 wagons. A telephone came in 1912 and a verandah in 1914. Authority to shift the verandah at Avondale station to Matamata when new station is built, and re-erect, amount £35. House for stationmaster. Platform extended to 175 feet. To extend it to 300 feet will cost £90. Authority for £60 for platform extension. 1919 extension of the verandah have been authorised. In 1919 part of the old Drury station building was erected as a luggage room at Matamata. Improvements are to be put in hand, estimated cost £6,000. Lighting of station and houses. 1927 Additional seating accommodation on platform. 1953	Approval for bicycle shed, estimated cost £90. There was a Post Office at the station until 1911. It had two members of staff from 1913. Matamata was included in the annual returns of railway traffic. For example, in 1924 it sold 26,367 tickets and exported 26,084 sheep and pigs. In 1950 8,868 tickets were sold and it transported 42,322 sheep and pigs. A petrol engined shunter was used in the station yard from 1936. Several Drewry 0-4-0 shunters were introduced in 1936.

The station building was replaced on Monday 17 May 1965 by a new £23,500 steel portal frame and block-work building, with a new platform and approach road from Hetana Street, built by Way & Works Branch staff. The old station was sold for removal by July 1967.

Matamata closed to passengers on 12 November 1968, but reopened to serve the Geyserland Express from 9 December 1991 until 7 October 2001.

Since closure the station has been the Railside by the Green community centre since 2002, though it is fenced off from the platform. Occasional excursions still use the platform.

Sports
Matamata is home to the Matamata Swifts soccer team, who compete in the Lotto Sport Italia NRFL Division 1A.

Educational institutions

The motto for Firth School is E Tipu E Rea, which translates as Grow and Flourish.

Notable people
 Shane Dye
 Casey Kopua
 Lance O'Sullivan
 Tim Mikkelson
 Hon Mike Rann CNZM
 Dame Patsy Reddy
 Dame Catherine Tizard
 Matthew Stanley
 Claudia Pond Eyley
 Kyle Wealleans

Nearby towns
Smaller towns nearby are:
 Hinuera
 Peria
 Turanga-O-Moana
 Te Poi
 Waharoa
 Walton, New Zealand
 Wardville, New Zealand

See also 
 List of towns in New Zealand
 List of reduplicated New Zealand place names

References

 
Populated places in Waikato